Gyrodactylus arcuatoides is an ectoparasite. It was found on the sand goby (Pomatoschistus minutus) in European coastal waters.

See also 
 Gyrodactylus gondae
 Gyrodactylus flavescensis
 Gyrodactylus branchialis

References 

Gyrodactylus
Animal parasites of fish
Animals described in 2004